Wingham/Richard W. LeVan Aerodrome  is a registered aerodrome  southeast of Wingham, Ontario, Canada. It hosts the Air Cadet gliding program in midwestern Ontario, and is used by agricultural spray aircraft.

It is classified as an airport of entry by Nav Canada. It is staffed by the Canada Border Services Agency (CBSA) on a call-out basis from the Waterloo International Airport on weekdays and the John C. Munro Hamilton International Airport on weekends. CBSA officers there can handle general aviation aircraft only, with no more than 15 passengers.

See also
Wingham (Inglis Field) Aerodrome

References

External links
 Township of North Huron airport description
Page about this airport on COPA's Places to Fly airport directory

Registered aerodromes in Ontario